The women's 4 × 400 metres relay event at the 1990 Commonwealth Games was held on 3 February at the Mount Smart Stadium in Auckland.

Results

References

Relay
1990
1990 in women's athletics